Sabine is an unincorporated community in Wyoming County, West Virginia, United States, along the Laurel Fork.

References

Unincorporated communities in West Virginia
Unincorporated communities in Wyoming County, West Virginia
Coal towns in West Virginia